Indiscreet may refer to:

Indiscreet (1998 film), a thriller starring Michael Nash and Gloria Reuben
Indiscreet (1958 film), a romantic comedy starring Ingrid Bergman and Cary Grant
Indiscreet (1931 film), a film featuring Gloria Swanson
Indiscreet (Sparks album), 1975
Indiscreet (FM album), 1986